The 2013 USASA National Women's Amateur was the 30th staging of the tournament, 14th since the introduction of the Open competition, and the first in five years.  Six teams competed in three matches each on June 28 and 29, with a final match on the 30th.  The Amateur competition occurred concurrently with the U23 competition, with the Open competition staged the three days before.

Group play

Schedule

Standings

Final

References

2013 domestic association football cups
National Women's Amateur
Soccer in Kansas
2013 in American women's soccer
USASA National Women's Amateur